Senator Drummond may refer to:

John W. Drummond (1919–2016), South Carolina State Senate
Josiah Hayden Drummond (1827–1902), Maine State Senate